Facing the Enemy is a 2001 erotic thriller film starring Linden Ashby, Maxwell Caulfield, and Alexandra Paul. The film was directed by Robert Malenfant and produced by Anita Gershman.

Premise
Detective Griffin "Griff" McCleary's son Kevin McCleary shoots himself with Griff's gun. A year later both he and his wife are still reeling from it. Griff feeling shut out by his wife Olivia, decides to move out. Now he is investigating what appears to be a murder a murder-suicide. He believes that there is no suicide. His investigation leads to a girl named Nikki Mayhew. It seems that Nikki is fragile and has not had much luck with men. When Griff helps her, she asks if she could stay with Griff, after she and Griff sleep together, she learns that he is a cop and that he has been following her, shattered Nikki shoots herself. Griff is then suspended from the force. But he is unaware that her partner-lover Harlan Moss, wanting to get back at Griff, Harlan is pursuing Griff's estranged wife Olivia. Who is vulnerable after hearing what happened between Griff and Nikki.

Cast
 Linden Ashby as Detective Griffin "Griff" McCleary
 Alexandra Paul as Olivia McCleary
 Maxwell Caulfield as Harlan Moss
 Cynthia Preston as Nikki Mayhew
 Melanie Wilson as Cassie Iver
 Bruce Weitz as Lieutenant Carl Runyon
 Max Gail as Thomas Galloway
 Christopher Comes as Benny Janovic
 June Chadwick as Irene Spellman
 Patricia Harty as Sandra Galloway
 Greg Fitzpatrick as Brett
 Judith Montgomery as Dolly Dixon
 Dyllan Christopher as Kevin McCleary
 Emmett Shoemaker as Jeff
 Anne Welles as Anita
 Christopher Kriesa as Detective Stewart
 Ron Smith as The Man On The Street (uncredited)

External links
 
 

2001 films
2000s thriller films